Making Babies (Swedish title: Hans och hennes) is a Swedish film from 2001, directed by Daniel Lind Lagerlöf.

Johan and Anna-Karin live somewhere in the countryside. Despite attempts, Anna-Karin can't get pregnant and the relationship with Johan is suffering because he never shoots.

Characters
Jonas Karlsson - Johan 
Johanna Sällström - Anna-Karin 
Ralph Carlsson - Henrik 
Shanti Roney - Clarence 
Michalis Koutsogiannakis - Dimitris 
Lisa Lindgren - Åsa

Reviews
The film was reviewed by Aftonbladet, Nöjesguiden, TV Guide, and others.

References

External links

Svensk filmdatabas

2001 films
Swedish drama films
2000s Swedish-language films
Films directed by Daniel Lind Lagerlöf
2000s Swedish films